Streptomyces caelestis is a bacterium species from the genus of Streptomyces which has been isolated from soil in Utah in the United States. Streptomyces caelestis produces desalicetin, isocelesticetin B, caelesticetin, citreamicin θ A, citreamicin θ B, citreaglycon A and dehydrocitreaglycon.

See also 
 List of Streptomyces species

References

Further reading

External links
Type strain of Streptomyces caelestis at BacDive – the Bacterial Diversity Metadatabase

caelestis
Bacteria described in 1955